Ruscus hypophyllum is a species of shrub in the family Asparagaceae. They have a self-supporting growth form and simple, broad leaves. Individuals can grow to 0.42 m.

Sources

References 

hypophyllum
Flora of Malta